Judith ("Jutta") Niehaus (born 1 October 1964) is a retired racing cyclist from West Germany, who represented her native country at the 1988 Summer Olympics in Seoul, South Korea. There she won the silver medal in the women's individual road race, losing to the Netherlands' Monique Knol in the sprint. She was born in Bocholt, North Rhine-Westphalia.

References

External links
  Profile

1964 births
Living people
People from Bocholt, Germany
Sportspeople from Münster (region)
German female cyclists
Cyclists at the 1988 Summer Olympics
Cyclists at the 1992 Summer Olympics
Olympic cyclists of West Germany
Olympic cyclists of Germany
Olympic silver medalists for West Germany
Olympic medalists in cycling
Cyclists from North Rhine-Westphalia
Medalists at the 1988 Summer Olympics
20th-century German women
21st-century German women